Kostas (Kitsos) Botsaris (c. 1792–1853), also known as Constantine Botzaris, was a Greek general and senator. He was also a captain and a hero of the War of Greek Independence. He fought at the Battle of Karpenisi and completed the victory of his brother, the renowned Markos Botsaris.

Early life

Kosta Botsaris was born in 1792 near Paramythia.

Greek War of Independence

In 1803 Kostas Botsaris and the remnants of the Souliotes crossed over to the Ionian Islands, where they ultimately took service in the French-raised Albanian Regiment. In 1814, he joined the Greek patriotic society known as the Filiki Eteria.
In 1820, he fought to the end on Ali Pasha's side against the Ottoman army.

On the night of 21 August 1823 Kostas, under the leadership of his brother Markos participated in the celebrated attack on Karpenisi by 350 Souliotes, against around 1000 Ottoman troops who formed the vanguard of the army with which Mustai Pasha was advancing to reinforce the besiegers. The Souliotes were victorious, however his brother was fatally wounded in the attack.

Later life
After the death of his brother Markos Botsaris, Kostas lived on to become a respected Greek general and parliamentarian in the Greek Kingdom. Fifteen years after the death of his brother, the American traveller and author Mr. John Lloyd Stephens visited Kostas Botsaris, then a colonel in the service of King Otto of Greece in Missolonghi, and described him as:

Botsaris continued to serve in the Greek kingdom until his death in Athens on 13 November 1853.

See also 
 Markos Botsaris
 Battle of Karpenisi
 Souliotes
 Greek War of Independence

References

Bibliography

 Incidents of Travel in Greece, Turkey, Russia and Poland (1838)

1792 births
Souliotes
1853 deaths
Hellenic Army generals
Members of the Filiki Eteria
Greek people of the Greek War of Independence
19th-century Greek politicians
French military personnel of the Napoleonic Wars
Members of the Greek Senate
English Party politicians
19th-century Greek military personnel